The RPS2 gene is the gene which, in humans, encodes the 40S ribosomal protein S2.

Ribosomes, the organelles that catalyze protein synthesis, consist of a small 40S subunit and a large 60S subunit. Together these subunits are composed of 4 RNA species and approximately 80 structurally distinct proteins. This gene encodes a ribosomal protein that is a component of the 40S subunit. The protein belongs to the S5P family of ribosomal proteins. It is located in the cytoplasm. This gene shares sequence similarity with mouse LLRep3. It is co-transcribed with the small nucleolar RNA gene U64, which is located in its third intron. As is typical for genes encoding ribosomal proteins, there are multiple processed pseudogenes of this gene dispersed through the genome.

Interactions
RPS2 has been shown to interact with PRMT3.

References

Further reading

External links 
 

Ribosomal proteins